In mathematical optimization, Himmelblau's function is a multi-modal function, used to test the performance of optimization algorithms.  The function is defined by:

 

 
 
 
 

The locations of all the minima can be found analytically. However, because they are roots of cubic polynomials, when written in terms of radicals, the expressions are somewhat complicated.

The function is named after David Mautner Himmelblau (1924–2011), who introduced it.

See also 
Test functions for optimization

References 

Mathematical optimization